The 2001 Super 12 season was the sixth season of the Super 12, contested by teams from Australia, New Zealand and South Africa. The season ran from February to May 2001, with each team playing all the others once. At the end of the regular season, the top four teams entered the playoff semi finals, with the first placed team playing the fourth and the second placed team playing the third. The winner of each semi final qualified for the final, which was contested by the ACT Brumbies and the Coastal Sharks at Bruce Stadium, Canberra. The ACT Brumbies won 36 – 6 to win their first Super 12 title, and became the first Super Rugby champions from outside New Zealand. This was the first year where a New Zealand team failed to make the playoffs.

Table

Results

Round 1

Round 2

Round 3

Round 4

Round 5

Round 6

Round 7

Round 8

Round 9

Round 10

Round 11

Round 12

Finals

Semi finals

Grand final

Top scorers
Points: Louis Koen 157 (Cats)
Tries: Andrew Walker 8 (Brumbies), Aisea Tuilevu 8 (Highlanders)

Attendances 

1
1
Super Rugby seasons
1
Super 12